Calibrachoa is a genus of plants in the Solanaceae (nightshade) family. They are evergreen short-lived perennials and subshrubs with a sprawling habit, with small petunia-type flowers. They are found across much the same region of South America as petunias, from southern Brazil across to Peru and Chile, inhabiting scrub and open grassland.

Classification
Calibrachoa are closely related to Petunia. However, on further examination it has been found that there are major differences in chromosomes, corresponding to external differences and fertilization factors that distinguished the two genera. Petchoa is a hybrid genus derived from crossing the genetically similar Calibrachoa and Petunia.

Calibrachoa was named by Vicente Cervantes after Antonio de la Cal y Bracho, a 19th-century Mexican botanist and pharmacologist.

Description
Calibrachoa are small shrubs or herbaceous plants with woody shoot axis that grow annual or perennial. The leaves are ovate, elliptic, reverse ovate or linear; its edge is flat or rolled back. The inflorescences are monochasial and have oppositely standing, foliage-like bracts. The flowers are usually zygomorphic, the bud cover is reciprocal in most species, the only exception is Calibrachoa pygmaea in both cases. The calyx has five or ten ribs, it is usually lobed to about the middle, the lobes are usually narrowed towards the top. The crown is funnel-shaped, only in Calibrachoa pygmaea it is salver-shaped, bulbous and tapered towards the tip. The color of the crown can be purple, red, pink or whitish.

The fruits are capsules. The seeds have a net-like surface. This structure is due to walls perpendicular to the seed surface, which are straight in all species.

Species

28 species, including:

Cultivation
Some Calibrachoa are cultivated as ornamental plants, popularly known as "Million Bells". The plants can tolerate light frost and thrive in sun or semi-shade. Plant in a free-draining soil and water only when the soil is almost dry. They can be propagated from tip cuttings, but are frequently grown as half-hardy annuals. They are suitable for container gardening and hanging baskets and will attract hummingbirds.

Cultivars
The following cultivars are recipients of the Royal Horticultural Society's Award of Garden Merit:-
='Balcabrite' 
='Wescapido' 
='Sunbelrikubu' 
='Kleca16364' 
 ='Kleca16356'
='Kleca18085'
='Kleca16006'

References

External links

GRIN Species List

Petunioideae
Solanaceae genera